Toktar Sabituly Zhangylyshbay  (born 25 May 1993) is a Kazakh footballer who plays as a forward for Maktaaral.

Career
On 16 March 2016, Zhangylyshbay signed a 1-year contract, with the option of a second year, with FC Aktobe. On 5 July 2016, Zhangylyshbay left Aktobe by mutual consent, signing for FC Zhetysu the following day.

Career statistics

Club

Honours

Club
 Shakhter Karagandy
 Kazakhstan Premier League: 2011
 Kazakhstan Cup: 2013
 Kazakhstan Super Cup: 2013
 Astana
 Kazakhstan Super Cup: 2015

References

External links

Living people
1993 births
Kazakhstani footballers
Kazakhstan international footballers
Kazakhstan under-21 international footballers
Kazakhstan Premier League players
FC Astana players
FC Shakhter Karagandy players
FC Kairat players
FC Aktobe players
FC Zhetysu players
Sportspeople from Karaganda
Association football forwards